The 2005 Slovak Cup Final was the final match of the 2004–05 Slovak Cup, the 36th season of the top cup competition in Slovak football. The match was played at the Štadión pod Zoborom in Nitra on 8 May 2005 between FK Dukla Banská Bystrica and FC Artmedia Petržalka. Dukla Banská Bystrica defeated Artmedia 2-1.

Route to the final

Match

Details

References

Slovak Cup Finals
Slovak Cup
Cup Final